Osteochilus sondhii is a species of cyprinid fish endemic to Myanmar. It is sometimes considered conspecific with Labeo dyocheilus.

Named in honor of geologist Ved Pall Sondhi (1903-1989), Geological Survey of India, who collected the type specimen.

References

Taxa named by Sunder Lal Hora
Taxa named by Dev Dev Mukerji
Fish described in 1934
Osteochilus